The Supreme Court of Namibia is the highest court in the judicial system of Namibia. It is the court of last resort and the highest appellate court in the country. It is located in the city centre of Namibia's capital city, Windhoek. A Supreme Court decision is supreme in that it can only be reversed by an Act of Parliament that contradicts it, or by another ruling of the Supreme Court itself.

History
Namibia's Supreme Court was founded on 21 March 1990, the day of Namibian Independence. Although it has the Supreme Court of South West Africa as its predecessor, the latter was not a supreme court in the sense that appeals against its rulings would be allowed; the Appellate Division of the Supreme Court of South Africa would hear those, and they would be prosecuted by the Supreme Court of South-West Africa.

Court building
At its inception in 1990, the Supreme Court did not have its own building. The Supreme Court building, situated in Michael Scott Street on Eliakim Namundjebo Plaza in central Windhoek, was built between 1994 and 1996 as an "imposing and functional building" to represent "the integrity and soul of the [...] Constitution". It was designed in a north African style in order to avoid resemblance of European colonial buildings, and it is Windhoek's only building erected post-independence in an African style of architecture. The building was constructed to contain two court rooms, four offices for justices, and a law library on the first floor. Erection and design of the building involved extensive geotechnical investigations because it is situated on top of a geological fault.

Mandate and power
The mandate and powers of the Supreme Court are regulated by Articles 78, 79 and 138 of the Namibian Constitution. It hears appeals against High Court decisions and matters referred from the Attorney General, particularly those that concern constitutional matters. It can also hear matters referred to it by parliamentary authorisation. The Supreme Court regulates its own procedures and makes Rules of Court.

A Supreme Court decision can only be reversed by an Act of Parliament that contradicts it, or by another ruling of the Supreme Court itself.

Structure and appointment
The Chief Justice of Namibia presides over the Supreme Court. They are supported by Judges of Appeal. All Supreme Court judges are appointed by the president on recommendation by the Judicial Service Commission. The  Chief Justice is His Lordship Peter Shivute.

Notable cases
In 1991, the court confirmed the prohibition of corporal punishment at state schools. It also clarified that this prohibition applies independent of parent's approval or disapproval of the measurement, and even if the pupil themselves agree to be punished in this way.
In 2001, when deciding a state appeal on a granted residence permit (Chairperson of the Immigration Selection Board v Frank and Another), the court noted: "The homosexual relationship, whether between men and men and women and women, clearly fall outside the scope and intent of Article 14" of the Constitution of Namibia (protection of the family).
In a civil matter spinning off from the Caprivi treason trial the Supreme Court of Namibia ordered government in 2002 (Government of Namibia and Others v Mwilima and Others) to provide the treason suspects with legal representation. In 2010 the court was again involved in this trial, ruling (State vs. Malumo and 24 Others) that confessions from 25 accused are inadmissible before the High Court in Windhoek due to the occurrence of "coercive actions" at the hands of Police or military to obtain the testimonies.
In 2009, the Supreme Court found that a 2000 agreement on the expansion of the coastal holiday settlement of Wlotzkasbaken (Erongo Regional Council and Others v Wlotzkasbaken Home Owners Association and Another) was unilaterally and unlawfully changed by the Erongo Regional Council, and decided in favour of the home owners.
In November 2014, the court upheld a decision by the High Court in LM & Others v Government of Namibia that three women had been coercively sterilised in state hospitals.
In February 2020, the court ruled on a case emanating from the 2019 Namibian general election. It resolved that the use of electronic voting machines (EVMs) without a Verifiable Paper Trail (VPPT) contravenes the Electoral Act of 2014, and that the decision to use EVMs without providing the paper trail as required by the act, is unconstitutional because it violates the separation of powers. The court, however, declined to set aside the elections carried out using such failed process, as there were no indications the devices were tampered with. This has attracted some controversy.

References

Further reading
 

 
Judiciary of Namibia
Buildings and structures in Windhoek
Namibia